Big Flats is an unincorporated community located in the town of Big Flats, Adams County, Wisconsin, United States.

Big Flats once had a post office, which opened in August 1862; John W. Potter was the first postmaster. The community most likely takes its name from Big Flats, New York.

References

Unincorporated communities in Adams County, Wisconsin
Unincorporated communities in Wisconsin